The following is a list of National Collegiate Athletic Association (NCAA) Division I college soccer team statistics through the 2017 NCAA Division I Men's Soccer Championship, including all-time number of wins, losses, and draws; number of tournaments played; and percent of games won.

Team Records
Most Single Team Goals, Single Game: 9
Saint Louis (vs. Stanford–3, 1962)
Michigan State (vs. Howard–1, 1962)
Howard (vs. Duke-0, 1972)
Appalachian State (vs. George Washington–3, 1978)
Most Combined Goals, Single Game: 12
Saint Louis 9, Stanford 3, 1962
Appalachian State 9, George Washington 3, 1978
Most Goals, Tournament: 17
Clemson, 1976
Clemson, 1978
UCLA, 2002
Most Shots, Game: 54
Connecticut 2, Rhode Island 3 (4OT), 1979
Most Corner Kicks, Game: 20
Connecticut 2, Hartford 1 (4OT), 1999
Most Fouls, Game: 50
Connecticut 2, Rhode Island 3 (4OT), 1979
Indiana 1, UC Santa Barbara 1 (2OT/PK), 2004
Goals Per Game, Tournament (minimum 2 games): 5.00
Saint Louis (15 goals, 3 games), 1959
Saint Louis (15 goals, 3 games), 1962
Appalachian State (10 goals, 2 games), 1978
Lowest Goals-Against Average Tournament (minimum 3 games): 0.00
San Francisco (0 goals against, 4 games), 1976
Wisconsin (0 goals against, 5 games), 1995
Akron (0 goals against, 5 games), 2009
Stanford (0 goals against, 5 games) 2016, 2017
Overtime Games, Tournament: 5
Alabama A&M, 1981
Longest Game: 166 minutes, 5 seconds
UCLA 1, American 0 (8OT), 1985

Ranking by number of wins, then winning percentage (Minimum of 4 wins) (As of 1960) 

Schools in Italics no longer compete in Division I.

References

External links 
 NCAA Men's Soccer

records